Clubland may refer to:

 St James's, an area of Westminster in London where many gentlemen's clubs were located
 Clubland (1991 film), a 1991 British television film by Nick Perry in the anthology series ScreenPlay
 Clubland (1999 film), an American film by Mary Lambert
 Clubland (2007 film), an Australian comedy film
 Clubland (band), a 1990s house-music group
 Clubland (dance brand), a UK dance album and events brand
 Clubland (compilation series), a series of compilation albums
 Clubland TV, a UK music channel
 Clubland (Screenplay), an installment, featuring David Morrissey, of the UK satirical anthology TV series Screenplay
 "Clubland" (song), a song by Elvis Costello
 Clubland, a block of dance-related music videos currently airing late nights on MTV in the United States.